Ch'iqu (Quechua for workable stone, misleadingly also named Volcán Chico (Spanish for "little volcano")) is a  volcano in Bolivia. It is located in the Potosí Department, Sud Lípez Province, San Pablo de Lípez Municipality. Ch'iqu lies northeast of Qhawana.

References 

Volcanoes of Potosí Department